

Judiciary system

Austria in 2008 had 141 district courts (Bezirksgerichte), 20 provincial courts (Landesgerichte), and four higher provincial courts (Oberlandesgerichte). There is also a Supreme Court (Oberster Gerichtshof), Constitutional Court (Verfassungsgerichtshof), and Administrative Court (Verwaltungsgerichtshof).

Life imprisonment
Parole may be granted to certain inmates in Austria after 15 years' imprisonment, if prison officials are satisfied that the inmate will not re-offend. This is subject to the discretion of a criminal court panel, and a possible appeal to the high court. Alternatively, the President may grant a pardon following a motion of the Minister of Justice. If the President rejects the petition of clemency or pardon, the offender will be sentenced to imprisonment for a lifetime, and thus will spend the rest of their natural life in prison. Inmates who committed their crime when they were below the age of 21 cannot be sentenced to life imprisonment. Instead, juvenile offenders can only be sentenced to a maximum of 20 years imprisonment.

See also

 Courts in Austria
Politics of Austria

References

External links 
 Books on the Austrian legal system 

Austria